There have been two baronetcies created for persons with the surname Freke, one in the Baronetage of Great Britain and one in the Baronetage of Ireland.

The Freke Baronetcy, of West Bilney in the County of Norfolk, was created in the Baronetage of Great Britain on 4 June 1713 for Ralph Freke. The title became extinct on the death of the third Baronet in 1764.

Grace, the daughter of Sir Ralph Freke and sister of the 2nd and 3rd Baronets, married in 1741 (the second son of 1st Baron Carbery) John Evans (d. 1777) of Bulgaden Hall co. Limerick. The baronetcy of Freke of Castle Freke was created for their son, John and his son inherited the barony of Carbery.

The Freke Baronetcy, of Castle Freke in the County of Cork, was created in the Baronetage of Ireland on 15 July 1768. For more information on this creation, see Baron Carbery.

Freke baronets, of West Bilney (1713)
Sir Ralph Freke, 1st Baronet (1675–1717)
Sir Percy Freke, 2nd Baronet (1700–1728)
Sir John Redmond Freke, 3rd Baronet (–1764)

Freke baronets, of Castle Freke (1768)
see Baron Carbery

References

Baronetcies in the Baronetage of Ireland
Extinct baronetcies in the Baronetage of Great Britain
1713 establishments in Great Britain